Deep Creek Township is one of twelve townships in Yadkin County, North Carolina, United States. The township had a population of 2,838, according to the 2000 census.

Geographically, Deep Creek Township occupies  in central and southern Yadkin County.  Deep Creek Township's southern border is with Iredell County.

Townships in Yadkin County, North Carolina
Townships in North Carolina